Carl Ludvig Engel, or Johann Carl Ludwig Engel (3 July 1778 – 14 May 1840), was a German architect whose most noted work can be found in Helsinki, which he helped rebuild. His works include most of the buildings around the capital's monumental centre, the Senate Square and the buildings surrounding it. The buildings are Helsinki Cathedral, The Senate (now the Palace of the Council of State), the City of Helsinki Town Hall, and the library and the main building of Helsinki University.

Biography
Carl Ludvig Engel was born in 1778 in Charlottenburg, Berlin, into a family of bricklayers.  It was probably as a bricklayer apprentice that he first came in contact with his future profession as an architect. He trained at the Berlin Institute of Architecture after which he served in the Prussian building administration. The stagnation caused by Napoleon's victory over Prussia in 1806 forced him and other architects to find work abroad. In 1808 he applied for the position as town architect of Tallinn, Estonia.  He got the job and in this way came into the vicinity of St. Petersburg and its neoclassical Empire style. Finland was also close by and was soon to experience a new governmental phase as a Grand Duchy under Russian rule.

Engel started working in Tallinn in 1809, but just after a few years he was forced to move on again because of a lack of assignments. From this period in Estonia, a palace on Kohtu street 8 in Tallinn survives (today housing the Estonian Chancellor of Justice) and, possibly, Kernu manor.

From 1814 to 1815 he worked for a businessman in Turku, Finland, and this way he came in contact with Johan Albrecht Ehrenström, who led the project of rebuilding Helsinki. The city had just been promoted to be the new capital of the new Grand Duchy of Finland. Ehrenström was searching for a talented architect to work at his side and this meeting proved to be decisive for Carl Ludvig Engel's future career. At this stage Engel did not however stay in Finland. In March 1815 he travelled to St. Petersburg where he got private employment.

In 1816 Engel was planning on returning to his city of birth, but at the same time Ehrenström got approval for his plan to get Engel to Helsinki. Engel's plans for Helsinki had been shown to Czar Alexander I and in February Engel was appointed architect of the reconstruction committee for Helsinki. Engel probably thought that this would once again be a temporary job, but instead Helsinki came to be his life's work.

In 1819–1820, when Engel's first creations were nearing completion, his status as a kind of head architect of the Grand Duchy was established when he received more and more building assignments, both private and public, in other parts of Finland. The final confirmation came when he in 1824 was appointed head of the statewide Intendant's Office, responsible for all key state buildings throughout the country, a position he was offered - but first refused because he still had hopes of returning to Prussia - following the resignation of its first head, the Italian-born architect Carlo Bassi, and which he retained until his death. Among his other key works from this period are Helsinki Old Church in Kamppi completed in 1826. He designed the first theater of Helsinki, Engels Teater, in 1827, though this was a rather modest building. He was also responsible for the new city plan for Turku after most of it was wiped out by the Great Fire of Turku in 1827.

Engel died on 14 May 1840 in Helsinki.

Gallery

See also
 Architecture of Finland

References

External links

 

1778 births
1840 deaths
Artists from Berlin
People from the Margraviate of Brandenburg
Finnish people of German descent
18th-century German architects
Finnish architects
German neoclassical architects
19th-century German architects